André C. De Takacs (1879 or 1880 – 1919) was an illustrator. His artwork features on the covers of sheet music. He produced art for posters, postcards, and film company promotions. He also wrote music and poetry. The Smithsonian Libraries have some of his song sheet covers in their collection. The University of South Carolina's Tin Pan Alley Sheet Music Collection also includes his work.

He used several distinctive signatures and marks. 
His work includes covers from the era when minstrel performers were still popular and depictions of African Americans are based on stereotypes.

He immigrated to the U.S. from Hungary where his father was a count. He died at the age of 39, reportedly of a heart attack in a New York City taxi on the way to the hospital. His wife, Elizabeth "Bessie" Schenkel, took her life several years later. They had two daughters, one of them, Edythe Jepson, also became an artist.

Work
"Array Wanna" (1906)
"If I Only Had the Nerve" (1906)
Musical Joys for Boys and Girls (1908)
"Falling Star" (1909)
"I'm On My Way to Reno" (1910)
"Air King" (1911)
"I'd Be Proud to Be the Mother of a Soldier" (1915)
"Honolulu Hicki Boola Boo Island" (1916)
"The Cute Little.Wigglin' Dance" (1917)
"Everybody's Jazzin It"
"Ragtime Cowboy Joe"
Nachette by Ned Nye, book
The Ashes of My Heart by Edith Blinn, book
Ad for The Long Chance (1915), a western film

References

19th-century births
1919 deaths
Year of birth uncertain
Hungarian emigrants to the United States
Hungarian illustrators
American illustrators